Ryan Bolaños Davis (born 19 December 1998) is a Costa Rican footballer who plays as a left-back for Liga FPD side Deportivo Saprissa.

Club career

Limon FC
Born and raised in Cahuita, Bolaños joined Limón F.C. at the age of 14. He already got his official and professional debut for C.S. Cartaginés in the Liga FPD at the age of 17 on 2 November 2016 against Pérez Zeledón. The young player made five league appearances in that season.

In the 2017–18 season, 18-year old Bolaños became a regular starter for Limon and made 34 appearances, scoring four goals. Having been a key player for the club for a few season, Bolaños' contract expired at the end of 2019, why he left the club.

Cartaginés
On 2 January 2020, Bolaños joined C.S. Cartaginés as a free agent. He made his debut on 12 January 2020 against Santos de Guápiles. In his first half-season at the club, he made 16 appearances. He made a total of 53 appearances for the club, before he left.

Deportivo Saprissa
On 3 January 2022, after two years at Cartaginés, Bolaños joined fellow league club Deportivo Saprissa on a two-year deal.

References

External links

Living people
1998 births
Association football defenders
Costa Rican footballers
Limón F.C. players
C.S. Cartaginés players
Deportivo Saprissa players
Liga FPD players